The Turkestan Front was a front of the Red Army during the Russian Civil War, which was formed on the territory of Turkestan Military District by Order of the Republic of Turkestan on February 23, 1919. It was formed a second time by the directive of the Commander-in-Chief on August 11, 1919 on the territory of Samara, Astrakhan, Orenburg Province and Ural region by renaming the Southern group of armies from the Eastern Front of the RSFSR. Its headquarters were in Samara and by 1920 the Turkestan Front counted some 114,000 soldiers.

Operations 

In May–July 1919 troops of the Turkestan Front defeated the Turkestan Army, an armed Formation of the AFSR in the Caspian region. In 1919, the troops of the Turkestan Front defeated the Southern Army of Admiral Kolchak, broke through the blockade of Turkestan (September 13, 1919) and joined with the troops of the Turkestan Soviet Republic.

Until mid-October 1919, the Turkestan Front fought against the Ural Cossack Army of General Vladimir Tolstov and the Army of Anton Denikin in the lower Volga and the Ural River. In the Ural-Guryev operation of 1919–1920, the troops of the Turkestan Front defeated the Ural Army and the Kazakh horde, and soon liquidated the White troops in Semirechye. As a result of the Bukhara operation (1920), the Emirate of Bukhara was overthrown. 

In 1921–1926, the troops of the Turkestan Front fought against the Basmachi movement in the Fergana Valley, Eastern Bukhara and Khiva. 
On October 12, 1922, the commander of the Turkestan Front ordered the formation of the 13th Rifle Corps from troops located on the territory of the Bukharan People's Soviet Republic and Samarkand region. 
 
After the suppression of the Basmachi Movement in June 1926, the Turkestan Front was transformed into the Central Asian Military District.

Composition 

 1st Army
 4th Army
 Turkestan Army
 Astrakhan Group of troops (until October 14, 1919, when it became part of the 11th Army)

Commanders 

Commanders were: 
 Ivan Belov (April 1919 – August 1919),
 Mikhail Frunze (August 15, 1919 – September 10, 1920),
 Grigori Sokolnikov (September 10, 1920 – March 8, 1921),
 Vladimir Lazarevich (March 8, 1921 – February 11, 1922),
 Vasily Shorin (February 11 – October 18, 1922),
 August Kork (October 18, 1922 – August 12, 1923),
 Semyon Pugachov (August 12, 1923 – April 30, 1924),
 Mikhail Levandovsky (April 30, 1924 – December 2, 1925),
 Konstantin Avksentevsky (December 2, 1925 – June 4, 1926).

Members of the Revolutionary Military Council included:
 Shalva Eliava
 Valerian Kuybyshev
 Yan Rudzutak
 Reingold Berzin
 Alexander Todorsky
 Nikolai Kuzmin

References 

Soviet units and formations of the Russian Civil War
Military units and formations established in 1919
Military units and formations disestablished in 1926
Soviet fronts